Roman Kreuziger (born 11 June 1965 in Uničov) is a Czech former bicycle racer. During his career, Kreuziger won the Tour of Austria in 1991 and the Cyclocross Junior World Championships in 1983. He is the father of racer Roman Kreuziger.

External links
 Roman Kreuziger profile at the Cyclingwebsite

1965 births
Living people
People from Uničov
Czech male cyclists
Cyclo-cross cyclists
Sportspeople from the Olomouc Region